Guntis Endzels (born 5 December 1967) is a Latvian professional basketball coach, who is currently a head coach for Latvijas Universitāte. 

Endzels has been head coach for Latvian youth national teams in FIBA continental championships. From 2006 to 2007 he was also an assistant for Latvia men's national basketball team head coach Kārlis Muižnieks. In 2018 he was an assistant for Latvia women's national basketball team head coach Mārtiņš Zībarts at the 2018 FIBA Women's Basketball World Cup.

References

Living people
1967 births
Latvian basketball coaches
People from Preiļi